Wapasha may refer to:

People
A succession of Mdewakanton Sioux chiefs
Wapasha I (1718-1806)
Wapasha II (c.1773–1836)
Wabasha III (1816-1876), also known as Joseph Wabasha
Wabasha IV, also known as Napoleon Wabasha

Ships
USS Wapasha (YN-45), later YNT-13, later YTB-737, a United States Navy net tender, later large harbor tug, in service from 1941 to 1947